Michael V. Fox (born 1940) is an American biblical scholar. He is a Halls-Bascom Professor Emeritus in the Department of Hebrew and Semitic Studies at the University of Wisconsin–Madison. Fox has been described as a "highly regarded authority on biblical wisdom literature."

Biography

Education 

From 1962 Fox holds a B.A. and from 1963 a M.A. from the University of Michigan. Fox received his rabbinical ordination from Hebrew Union College; then  studied Biblical Studies and Egyptology at the Hebrew University of Jerusalem, receiving a PhD in 1972.

Academic work 

He taught in Israel for several years and in 1977 moved to Madison, Wisconsin, where he taught in the University of Wisconsin–Madison Department of Hebrew and Semitic Studies for the next 33 years (1977-2010). Named Max and Frieda Weinstein-Bascom Professor in 1991 in Jewish Studies and Halls-Bascom Professor of Hebrew in 1999, he took a sabbatical in Israel in 2006 and then taught as George Mosse Exchange Professor at the Hebrew University.

Published works
A bibliographical article by L.J. Mykytiuk reviewing the publications of Michael V. Fox appeared in Fox's Festschrift.

Books
Proverbs 1-9 (The Anchor Yale Bible Commentaries)
Proverbs 10-31 (The Anchor Yale Bible Commentaries)
Character and Ideology in the Book of Esther Second Edition with a New Postscript on A Decade of Esther Scholarship
Ecclesiastes: The Traditional Hebrew Text with the New JPS Translation (The Jps Bible Commentary)
The Song of Songs and the Ancient Egyptian Love Songs
A Time to Tear Down and a Time to Build Up: A Rereading of Ecclesiastes

Articles 
Fox's articles are available at his Academia.edu profile.

References

Living people
Hebrew University of Jerusalem alumni
University of Wisconsin–Madison faculty
American biblical scholars
American male writers
Old Testament scholars
Bible commentators
Hebrew Union College – Jewish Institute of Religion alumni
1940 births